Princess Bilqis Begum (born 17 April 1932) is a former Afghan princess.

She was the daughter of king Mohammed Zahir Shah and queen Humaira Begum. In 1951, she married Sardar Abdul Wali Khan (1925-2008).

She was educated at Malali School, Kabul.

In 1959, she and her mother the queen supported the call by the Prime minister Mohammed Daoud Khan for women to voluntary remove their veil by removing their own.
This was a big event in the history of women in Afghanistan, and it was also an intentional part of the women's emancipation policy of the Daoud Government at that time.   The step was carefully prepared by introducing women workers at the Radio Kabul in 1957, sending women delegates to the Asian Women's Conference in Kairo, and employing forty girls to the government pottery factory in 1958.  When this was met with no riots, the government decided it was time for the very controversial step of unveiling.  In August 1959 therefore, on the second day of the festival of Jeshyn, Queen Humaira and Princess Bilqis appeared in the royal box at the military parade unveiled, alongside the Prime Minister's wife, Zamina Begum (her paternal aunt).

After this point onward, Princess Bilqis Begum participated in public royal representational duties unveiled, and attended many public functions in Afghanistan as well as abroad. In 1971, she attended the 2,500-year celebration of the Persian Empire, where she represented the Afghan royal family with her spouse.

Her father was deposed in 1973.

Issue
Princess Humaira Begum
Princess Wana Begum
Princess Mayana Khanum

Ancestry

References 

1932 births
Afghan princesses
Barakzai dynasty
Living people
Daughters of kings